Pisarev is a Russian masculine surname, its feminine counterpart is Pisareva. It may refer to
 Aleksander Pisarev (1803-1828), Russian playwright
 Andrey Pisarev (born 1962), Russian pianist
 Dmitry Pisarev (1840–1868), Russian writer and social critic
 Igor Pisarev (1931–2001), Soviet sprint canoer
 Kirill Pisarev (born 1969), Russian entrepreneur and investor 
 Mariya Pisareva (born 1934), Soviet high jumper
 Modest Pisarev (1844-1905), Russian stage actor and theatre critic
 Nikolai Pisarev (born 1968), Russian football player
 Vadim Pisarev (born 1965), Ukrainian dancer

Russian-language surnames